Acrocercops poliocephala is a moth of the family Gracillariidae. It is known from Queensland, Australia.

References

Poliocephala
Moths described in 1913
Moths of Queensland